{{Taxobox
| name = Trichomyrmex
| image = Monomorium destructor casent0125190 profile 1.jpg
| image_caption = Trichomyrmex destructor worker
| regnum = Animalia
| phylum = Arthropoda
| classis = Insecta
| ordo = Hymenoptera
| familia = Formicidae
| subfamilia = Myrmicinae
| tribus = Crematogastrini
| genus = Trichomyrmex
| genus_authority = Mayr, 1865
| type_species = Trichomyrmex rogeri
| diversity_link = #Species
| diversity_ref = <ref name="AntCat">{{AntCat|429720|Trichomyrmex|2014|accessdate=17 January 2015}}</ref>
| diversity = 20 species
| synonyms = *Equestrimessor Santschi, 1919Holcomyrmex Mayr, 1879Parholcomyrmex Emery, 1915
}}Trichomyrmex''' is a genus of ants in the subfamily Myrmicinae. Described by Mayr in 1865, it was raised as a genus in 2015. These ants are endemic to multiple continents.

SpeciesTrichomyrmex aberrans Forel, 1902Trichomyrmex abyssinicus (Forel, 1894)Trichomyrmex almosayari Sharaf & Aldawood, 2016Trichomyrmex chobauti (Emery, 1896)Trichomyrmex criniceps (Mayr, 1879)Trichomyrmex destructor (Jerdon, 1851)Trichomyrmex emeryi Mayr, 1895Trichomyrmex epinotale Santschi, 1923Trichomyrmex glaber (André, 1883)Trichomyrmex lameerei (Forel, 1902)Trichomyrmex mayri (Forel, 1902)Trichomyrmex muticus (Emery, 1887)Trichomyrmex oscaris Forel, 1894Trichomyrmex perplexus (Radchenko, 1997)Trichomyrmex robustior (Forel, 1892)Trichomyrmex rogeri Mayr, 1865Trichomyrmex santschii (Forel, 1907)Trichomyrmex scabriceps (Mayr, 1879)Trichomyrmex shakeri Sharaf & Al Dhafer, 2016Trichomyrmex wroughtoni'' Forel, 1911

References

Myrmicinae
Ant genera